Forest of the Damned (known in the United States as 
Johannes Roberts' Demonic) is a 2005 British horror 
feature film directed by Johannes Roberts.

Plot

Five friends have a car accident and fall into the clutches of fallen angels who first seduce their victims and then kill them. A deadly battle of seduction, fear, and blood consumes the group as these angels have an insatiable appetite for human flesh.

Cast
 Nicole Petty as Molly
 Daniel MacLagan as Judd
 Tom Savini as Stephen
 Shaun Hutson as himself
 Marysia Kay as Angel 1
 Richard Cambridge as Emilio
 Sophie Holland as Ally
 David Hood as Andrew
 Eleanor James as Angel 2

Release
The film premiered on 13 May 2005 at the Cannes Film Festival and was released in the UK on 26 November 2005.

Reception

Jon Condit from Dread Central gave the film a score of 2.5 out of 5, stating that the film's director "took something worthy of praise and ruined it with too much added showiness that degrades it into nothing more than another sub-par horror flick". Film Threat criticized the film's "paper-thin characters", grating soundtrack, and visual style.

Sequel

Forest of the Damned 2, directed by Ernest Riera, was released in 2008. Eleanor James and Marysia Kay reprise their roles as bloodthirsty fallen angels.

References

External links
 

2005 films
2005 horror films
British horror films
British supernatural horror films
Films set in forests
Films shot in England
Films directed by Johannes Roberts
Films with screenplays by Johannes Roberts
2000s English-language films
2000s British films